Jamesiella is a genus of fungi in the family Gomphillaceae. The type species of the genus, Jamesiella anastomosans, is now classified in the genus Gyalideopsis.

The genus name of Jamesiella is in honour of Peter Wilfrid James (1930 - 2014), who was an English botanist (Mycology and Lichenology), who worked at the  Natural History Museum, London.

The genus was circumscribed by Robert Lücking, Emmanuël Sérusiaux and Antonín Vězda in Lichenologist vol.37 on page 165 in 2005.

References

Ostropales genera
Ostropales
Lichen genera
Taxa named by Robert Lücking
Taxa named by Antonín Vězda
Taxa named by Emmanuël Sérusiaux
Taxa described in 2005